Donald Chumley (born March 14, 1962) is a former American football defensive tackle who played one season with the Calgary Stampeders of the Canadian Football League (CFL). He was drafted by the San Francisco 49ers of the National Football League (NFL) in the 12th round of the 1985 NFL Draft. He played college football at the University of Georgia and attended Groves High School in Garden City, Georgia.

Professional career
Chumley was selected by the San Francisco 49ers of the NFL with the final pick in the 1985 NFL Draft, earning him the title of Mr. Irrelevant. He signed with the CFL's Calgary Stampeders in September 1985 after being released by the 49ers.

Coaching career
Chumley became head coach of the Savannah Christian Raiders of Savannah, Georgia in 2005.

References

External links
 Just Sports Stats

Living people
1962 births
American football defensive tackles
American players of Canadian football
Canadian football defensive linemen
Calgary Stampeders players
Georgia Bulldogs football players
San Francisco 49ers players
High school football coaches in Georgia (U.S. state)
Sportspeople from Hamburg
Players of American football from Savannah, Georgia